Mat Flint is an English musician, who has been a member of several bands including Revolver (1990–1994), Hot Rod (1993), Death in Vegas (1996–2005), and Deep Cut (2006–present).

Biography
Flint hails from Coventry, grew up near Peterborough, before his family moved to Winchester when he was 16. He played in one band prior to Revolver, with future Revolver drummer Nick Dewey. They formed Revolver in 1990, with Flint acting as vocalist and guitarist and also playing organ. After two albums and several singles, they split up in early 1994. The previous year, Flint had joined Paula Kelley of Drop Nineteens' band Hot Rod, in which he played bass and provided backing vocals. The band also featured John Dragonetti and Eric Paull. They released a single album in 1993, Speed Danger Death. Flint then joined Death in Vegas as bassist, and played on all of their albums, as well as performing at every live show from 1996 to 2005. In 2006, Flint formed a new band, Deep Cut, in which he plays guitar, releasing a single "Commodity" in May 2007, on Club AC30 Records, and following this with "Time to Kill" in 2008 and debut album My Thoughts Light Fires in February 2009. Deep Cut's new album Disorientation was released by Club AC30 in September 2011.

Flint supports Coventry City F.C.

Discography

with Revolver
see Revolver discography

with Hot Rod
 Speed Danger Death CD (1993), Caroline

with Death in Vegas
see Death in Vegas discography

with Deep Cut

Albums
 My Thoughts Light Fires (2009), Club AC30

Singles
 "Commodity" (2007), Club AC30
 "Time to Kill" (2008), Club AC30

References

Year of birth missing (living people)
Living people
English rock bass guitarists
Place of birth missing (living people)
Male bass guitarists
English male singers
English rock guitarists
Death in Vegas members